Principia Sardonica is the second studio album by the American heavy metal band Rigor Sardonicous. It was released in 2004 on Paragon Records and is the band's first full-length album in 5 years. The album contains the 15-minute track "Possession".

Track listing

Personnel
Joseph J. Fogarazzo – guitars, vocals
Glenn Hampton – vocals, guitars, bass

External links
 [ Allmusic review]

Rigor Sardonicous albums
2004 albums
Paragon Records albums